The 1995 Asian PGA Tour, titled as the 1995 Omega Tour for sponsorship reasons, was the inaugural season of the Asian PGA Tour, the second men's professional golf tour in Asia (outside of Japan) alongside the long established Asia Golf Circuit.

Schedule
The following table lists official events during the 1995 season.

Order of Merit
The Order of Merit was based on prize money won during the season, calculated in U.S. dollars.

Notes

References

Asian PGA Tour
Asian Tour